Agonopsis asperoculis is a fish in the family Agonidae. It was described by William Francis Thompson in 1916. It is a tropical, marine fish which is known from off the coasts of Argentina and the Falkland Islands, in the southwestern Atlantic Ocean. It is known to dwell at a depth range of 18–20 metres.

References

asperoculis
Taxa named by William Francis Thompson
Fish described in 1916